Borre may refer to:

Places 
 Borre, Norway, a former municipality and village
 The Borre mound cemetery
Borre Golfbane, a golf course
Borre IF, multi-sports club
 Borre, Nord, a commune of the Nord département, France
 Borre, Denmark, a village on the island of Møn
Borre Fen, Himmerland, Denmark, a bog
 A placename "borrenakken" in Vaalse county, on the Northern part of the Island of Falster, south of Zealand, Denmark

People 
 Anthony Vanden Borre, Belgian footballer
 Martin Borre, Danish footballer
Peter Borre (1716–1789), Danish merchant
Anne-Sophie Vanden Borre (born 2001), Belgian field hockey player
Matthias Vanden Borre (born 1984), Belgian lawyer and politician
Stephanie Vanden Borre (born 1997), Belgian field hockey player

Other uses 

 Borre style, a Scandinavian art style named after a boat grave in Borre, Norway

See also 
 Rafael Santos Borré
Børre